Franz Ergert (also Ergerth) was an Austrian textile manufacturer and a pioneer of industrialisation.

References 

1758 births
1831 deaths
Austrian industrialists
People from Jablonné v Podještědí
18th-century Austrian businesspeople
19th-century Austrian businesspeople
German Bohemian people
Austrian people of German Bohemian descent